Beauty World may refer to:

 Beauty World (musical), a 1988 Singaporean musical
 Beauty World (TV series), a 2011 Chinese television series
 Beauty World MRT station, a rapid transit station in Singapore